Phaeosphaeria avenaria f.sp. avenaria is a plant pathogen affecting oat.

See also
 List of oat diseases

References

External links
 USDA ARS Fungal Database

Fungal plant pathogens and diseases
Oats diseases
Phaeosphaeriaceae
Forma specialis taxa
Fungi described in 1895